Douwe Juwes de Dowe (1608–1662) was a Dutch Golden Age painter from the Netherlands.

Dowe was born in Leeuwarden. He was influenced by the Gouda stained glass works of the painter Dirck Reiniersz. van der Douw. He is known for portraits in Leeuwarden during the years 1623–1661.

References

1608 births
1662 deaths
People from Leeuwarden
Dutch Golden Age painters
Dutch male painters